Taikoo Shing or Tai Koo Shing, is a private residential development in Quarry Bay, in the eastern part of Hong Kong Island, Hong Kong. It is a part of Swire's property business, along with Taikoo Place, the adjacent Cityplaza retail and office complex and EAST, a lifestyle business hotel.

Etymology 

Taikoo is the Cantonese pronunciation of Swire's Chinese name, while Shing can be literally translated as City. Thus, Taikoo Shing can be loosely translated as Swire City. According to Swire, its Chinese name Taikoo was chosen by Thomas Taylor Meadow, the British Consul in Shanghai when Swire's Shanghai office opened in 1866.

Area

History
The Taikoo Shing estate was once the site of Taikoo Dockyard, whose foundation stone now lies beside Cityplaza. The dockyard moved to United Dockyards at the west shore of the Tsing Yi Island in the late 1970s, and Taikoo Shing was constructed over the site in stages, with constructions of all main residential buildings complete by the early 1990s.

As part of the business strategy, Swire Properties was established in 1972 immediately after the closing of the dockyard. Taikoo Shing became one of Hong Kong's first major private housing estates. Completing in 1986, Swire immediately became one of the largest property companies doing the construction themselves. The area was designed to maximise middle-class residential capacity.

Development of commercial areas still continues today. After the completion of Cityplaza 3 and 4 as office buildings, the original Cityplaza 1 was demolished in the mid-90s for redevelopment. As of 2007, the food market that was originally constructed was demolished to make room for a hotel.

Population and demographics
In the 2011 census, Taikoo Shing recorded 36,796 residents. The median monthly rent among rental households was $18,000.

Apartment flats in Taikoo Shing are popular amongst buyers and speculators, and for a significant time in the 1980s and 1990s, Taikoo Shing's housing price is a general indicator of the Hong Kong's housing market health in general. Although in recent years, newer housing developments have eroded a bit of Taikoo Shing's once prominent status.

The estate is also a very sought-after place to live for the Japanese and Korean expatriate communities in Hong Kong, most of which are staffed in multinational corporations based in Hong Kong. As a result of this significant Korean and Japanese settlement, the area has many Korean and Japanese-themed service establishments.

Housing

The housing in Taikoo Shing was developed in stages, with the Tsui Woo Terrace being the first ones constructed. In all, the estate's housing complexes are broken down into 6 terraces and 2 gardens, each with a special naming scheme.

It is important to note that those mansions under the "garden" group are considered to be premium housing, and more expensive than those that fall under the "terrace" category.

Tsui Woo Terrace
Tsui Woo Terrace (literally: "Terrace of the Jade Lake"); all of the mansions on this terrace are named after famous lakes in China. The terrace consists of three mansions.
Tung Ting Mansion Note: name is a reference to Dongting Lake.
Po Yang Mansion Note: name is a reference to Poyang Lake.
Tai Woo Mansion Note: name is a reference to Lake Tai.

Ko Shan Terrace
Ko Shan Terrace (literally: "Terrace of the High Mountain"); all of the mansions on this terrace have the Chinese word for "Mountain" (山) as the second character of the building's name. A couple of the mansion's names also corresponds to famous mountains in China. The terrace consists of 13 mansions.
Tung Shan Mansion
Tien Shan Mansion
Tai Shan Mansion 
Lo Shan Mansion
Nam Shan Mansion
Po Shan Mansion
Heng Shan Mansion
Wah Shan Mansion
Loong Shan Mansion
Foong Shan Mansion
Yee Shan Mansion
Kam Shan Mansion
Fu Shan Mansion

Kam Din Terrace
Kam Din Terrace (literally: "Terrace of the Golden Palace"); all of the mansions on this terrace have the Chinese word for "Palace" (宮) as the second character of the building's name. In addition, all of the mansions names' first character corresponds to various political dynasties in Chinese history. The terrace consists of 8 mansions.
Tang Kung Mansion Note: first character of this mansion's name is a reference to the Tang dynasty.
Yen Kung Mansion Note: first character of this mansion's name is a reference to a rebel dynasty in ancient China.
Yuan Kung Mansion Note: first character of this mansion's name is a reference to the Yuan dynasty.
Ming Kung Mansion Note: first character of this mansion's name is a reference to the Ming dynasty.
Hsia Kung Mansion Note: first character of this mansion's name is a reference to the Xia dynasty.
Han Kung Mansion Note: first character of this mansion's name is a reference to the Han dynasty.
Chai Kung Mansion Note: first character of this mansion's name is a reference to the Qi dynasty.
Tsui Kung Mansion Note: first character of this mansion's name is a reference to the Sui dynasty.

On Shing Terrace
On Shing Terrace (literally: "Terrace of Peace and Prosperity"); all of the mansions on this terrace have the Chinese word for "Peace" (安) as the second character of the building's name. The terrace consists of 6 mansions.
Ning On Mansion
Po On Mansion
Shun On Mansion
Hing On Mansion
Kin On Mansion
Ko On Mansion

Harbour View Gardens

Harbour View Gardens; all of the mansions in this area are named after flora. The area consists of 11 mansions.
Pine Mansion
Banyan Mansion
Willow Mansion
Oak Mansion
Maple Mansion
Juniper Mansion
Marigold Mansion
Begonia Mansion
Lotus Mansion
Wisteria Mansion
Primrose Mansion

Kwun Hoi Terrace
Kwun Hoi Terrace (literally: "Terrace for Ocean Viewing"); all of the mansions on this terrace have the Chinese word for "Ocean" (海) as the second character of the building's name, and a cardinal direction as the first character of the building's name. The terrace consists of 3 mansions.
Pak Hoi Mansion
Tung Hoi Mansion
Nam Hoi Mansion

Sing Fai Terrace

Sing Fai Terrace (literally: "Terrace of the Stars"); all of the mansions on this terrace have the Chinese word for "star" (星) as the second character of the building's name. Some of the building names are similar to Chinese names for planets within the Solar System. The terrace consists of 8 mansions.
Hang Sing Mansion
Tien Sing Mansion
Hoi Sing Mansion
Wai Sing Mansion
Yiu Sing Mansion
Chi Sing Mansion
Kam Sing Mansion
Ngan Sing Mansion

Horizon Garden

Horizon Garden; all of the mansions on this terrace have the Chinese word for "sky" (天) as the second character of the building's name. The area consists of 9 mansions.
Kai Tien Mansion
Hoi Tien Mansion
Fu Tien Mansion
Choi Tien Mansion
Heng Tien Mansion
Kwun Tien Mansion
Yat Tien Mansion
Nam Tien Mansion
King Tien Mansion

Amenities
Some terraces - Horizon Gardens, Kam Din Terrace, Sing Fai Terrace, and Kao Shan Terrace - have podiums that provide a public space for their residents, often including a children's playground. Elderly residents may practice t'ai chi in the mornings. There are also shops and learning centres on these podiums such as Kumon.

In addition, Harbour View Gardens, Horizon Gardens and Kwun Hoi Terrace all have access to swimming pools. In Kao Shan Terrace, there are badminton courts and tennis courts for residents to use.

Education

There are a few kindergartens in the vicinity of Tai Koo Shing, as well as the international school Delia School of Canada.

Taikoo Shing is in Primary One Admission (POA) School Net 14. Within the school net are multiple aided schools (operated independently but funded with government money) and North Point Government Primary School.

Car parks
All terraces have indoor car parks, providing parking spaces on monthly lease.

There are parking spaces available for visitors on hourly rate in the car parks at Cityplaza and Sing Fai Terrace.

Transportation

The estate is served by MTR Tai Koo station of the Island line, as well as various bus lines, served by New World First Bus and the Kowloon Motor Bus to Shau Kei Wan, Admiralty, Sheung Wan, Tsim Sha Tsui and Jordan.

As it is a private estate, all roads were owned by Swire Properties. However, most roads were returned to the Government except for those near Cityplaza. In practice, public traffic is generally allowed to pass freely, but admission may be denied.

See also
Cityplaza
Taikoo Place
Kornhill and Kornhill Gardens
Nam Fung Sun Chuen
King's Road
Island Eastern Corridor
North Point
Quarry Bay

References

External links

Satellite image of Taikoo Shing and its vicinity from Google Maps
Emporis - details of individual buildings
 S.K. Hui, A. Cheung, J. Pang, "A Hierarchical Bayesian Approach for Residential Property Valuation:Application to Hong Kong Housing Market", International Real Estate Review, 2010 Vol. 13 No.1: pp. 1 – 29

Swire Group
Quarry Bay
Private housing estates in Hong Kong